Yu Xiaogang is a Chinese environmentalist. He was awarded the Goldman Environmental Prize in 2006 for his efforts in "creating groundbreaking watershed management programs while researching and documenting the socioeconomic impact dams had on local Chinese communities". He is among the six winners of the 2009 Ramon Magsaysay Awards, considered by many to be the Asian equivalent of the Nobel prize. He completed his Master's from the Asian Institute of Technology(AIT) in Thailand and his award citation says: 
His (Yu Xiaogang) interest in the environment was cultivated during a stint in the Yunnan Academy of Social Sciences, and was further deepened when he attended the Asian Institute of Technology, where he earned a master's degree in watershed management.

References

Chinese scientists
Chinese environmentalists
Living people
Asian Institute of Technology alumni
Ramon Magsaysay Award winners
21st-century Chinese scientists
Year of birth missing (living people)
Goldman Environmental Prize awardees